Cristian Ali Gil Mosquera (born 18 August 1979) is a Colombian professional footballer.

Club career

Vista Hermosa
In 2005, Mosquera signed with C.D. Vista Hermosa.

Atlético Marte
In June 2012, Mosquera signed with C.D. Atlético Marte.

UES
In 2013, Mosquera signed with C.D. Universidad de El Salvador.

Return to Atlético Marte
Mosquera signed again with Atlético Marte for the Clausura 2016.

Audaz
In 2016, Mosquera signed with C.D. Audaz.

Return to UES
Mosquera signed again with UES for the Clausura 2017.

Brujos de Izalco
After left UES, Mosquera signed with Brujos de Izalco.

Death of Álex Obregón
Gil suffered severe injuries to the skull and thorax in a car crash in 2009, on the road to and just outside La Libertad. Former teammate and friend, Colombian player Alexander Obregón died in the same accident. Gil's condition was stable but he remained in intensive care the following days.

Honours

Club 
C.D. Vista Hermosa
 Primera División
 Champion: Apertura 2005

References

1979 births
Living people
Footballers from Cali
Association football forwards
Colombian footballers
Categoría Primera A players
Deportivo Cali footballers
Deportivo Pasto footballers
Caracas FC players
S.D. Quito footballers
La Equidad footballers
C.D. Vista Hermosa footballers
Atlético Balboa footballers
San Salvador F.C. footballers
C.D. Atlético Marte footballers
Colombian expatriate footballers
Expatriate footballers in Venezuela
Expatriate footballers in Ecuador
Expatriate footballers in El Salvador